Niko Schneebauer (born 14 June 1998) is an Austrian football player. He plays for SC Imst.

Club career
He made his Austrian Football First League debut for WSG Wattens on 16 August 2016 in a game against Kapfenberger SV.

Personal life
His twin brother René Schneebauer is also a football player.

References

External links
 

1998 births
Living people
Austrian twins
Twin sportspeople
Austrian footballers
WSG Tirol players
Austrian Regionalliga players
2. Liga (Austria) players
Association football midfielders